There are 112 genera of mosquitoes, containing approximately 3,500 species.

Human malaria is transmitted only by females of the genus Anopheles. Of the approximately 430 Anopheles species, while over 100 are known to be able to transmit malaria to humans, only 30–40 commonly do so in nature. Mosquitoes in other genera can transmit different diseases, such as yellow fever and dengue for species in the genus Aedes. The genus Aedes has over 950 species.

Since breeding and biting habit differ considerably between species, species identification is important for control programmes.

Subfamily Anophelinae

Genus Anopheles Meigen, 1818
Subgenus Anopheles Meigen, 1818
Subgenus Baimaia Harbach, Rattanarithikul and Harrison, 2005
Subgenus Cellia Theobald, 1905
Subgenus Kerteszia Theobald, 1905
Subgenus Lophopodomyia Antunes, 1937
Subgenus Nyssorhynchus Blanchard, 1902
Section Albimanus
Section Argyritarsis
Section Myzorhynchella
Subgenus Stethomyia Theobald, 1902
Genus Bironella Theobald, 1905
Subgenus Bironella Theobald, 1905
Subgenus Brugella Edwards, 1930
Subgenus Neobironella Tenorio, 1977
Genus Chagasia Cruz, 1906

Subfamily Culicinae

Tribe Aedeomyiini
Genus Aedeomyia
Subgenus Aedeomyia
Subgenus Lepiothauma

Tribe Aedini
Genus Abraedes
Genus Aedes
Genus Alanstonea
Genus Albuginosus
Genus Armigeres
Subgenus Armigeres
Subgenus Leicesteria
Genus Ayurakitia
Genus Aztecaedes
Genus Belkinius
Genus Borichinda
Genus Bothaella
Genus Bruceharrisonius
Genus Christophersiomyia
Genus Collessius
Subgenus Alloeomyia
Subgenus Collessius
Genus Dahliana
Genus Danielsia
Genus Diceromyia
Genus Dobrotworskyius
Genus Downsiomyia
Genus Edwardsaedes
Genus Eretmapodites
Genus Finlaya
Genus Fredwardsius
Genus Georgecraigius
Subgenus Georgecraigius
Subgenus Horsfallius
Genus Gilesius
Genus Gymnometopa
Genus Haemagogus
Subgenus Conopostegus
Subgenus Haemagogus
Genus Halaedes
Genus Heizmannia
Subgenus Heizmannia
Subgenus Mattinglyia
Genus Himalaius
Genus Hopkinsius
Subgenus Hopkinsius
Subgenus Yamada
Genus Howardina
Genus Huaedes
Genus Hulecoeteomyia
Genus Indusius
Genus Isoaedes
Genus Jarnellius
Subgenus Jarnellius
Subgenus Lewnielsenius
Genus Jihlienius
Genus Kenknightia
Genus Kompia
Genus Leptosomatomyia
Genus Lorrainea
Genus Luius
Genus Macleaya
Subgenus Chaetocruiomyia
Subgenus Macleaya
Genus Molpemyia
Genus Mucidus
Subgenus Mucidus
Subgenus Lewnielsenius
Genus Neomelaniconion
Genus Ochlerotatus
Subgenus Acartomyia
Subgenus Buvirilia
Subgenus Chrysoconops
Subgenus Culicelsa
Subgenus Empihals
Subgenus Geoskusea
Subgenus Gilesia
Subgenus Levua
Subgenus Ochlerotatus
Subgenus Pholeomyia
Subgenus Protoculex
Subgenus Pseudoskusea
Subgenus Rhinoskusea
Subgenus Rusticoidus
Subgenus Sallumia
Genus Opifex
Subgenus Nothoskusea
Subgenus Opifex
Genus Paraedes
Genus Patmarksia
Genus Phagomyia
Genus Pseudarmigeres
Genus Psorophora
Subgenus Grabhamia
Subgenus Janthinosoma
Subgenus Psorophora
Genus Rampamyia
Genus Scutomyia
Genus Skusea
Genus Stegomyia
Genus Tanakaius
Genus Tewarius
Genus Udaya
Genus Vansomerenis
Genus Verrallina
Subgenus Harbachius
Subgenus Neomacleaya
Subgenus Verrallina
Genus Zavortinkius
Genus Zeugnomyia

Tribe Culicini
Genus Culex
Subgenus Acalleomyia
Subgenus Acallyntrum
Subgenus Aedinus
Subgenus Afroculex
Subgenus Allimanta
Subgenus Anoedioporpa
Subgenus Barraudius
Subgenus Belkinomyia
Subgenus Carrollia
Subgenus Culex
Subgenus Culiciomyia
Subgenus Eumelanomyia
Subgenus Kitzmilleria
Subgenus Lasiosiphon
Subgenus Lophoceraomyia
Subgenus Maillotia
Subgenus Melanoconion
Subgenus Micraedes
Subgenus Microculex
Subgenus Neoculex
Subgenus Nicaromyia
Subgenus Oculeomyia
Subgenus Phenacomyia
Subgenus Phytotelmatomyia
Subgenus Sirivanakarnius
Subgenus Tinolestes
Genus Deinocerites
Genus Galindomyia
Genus Lutzia
Subgenus Insulalutzia
Subgenus Lutzia
Subgenus Metalutzia

Tribe Culisetini
Genus Culiseta
Subgenus Allotheobaldia
Subgenus Austrotheobaldia
Subgenus Climacura
Subgenus Culicella
Subgenus Culiseta
Subgenus Neotheobaldia
Subgenus Theomyia

Tribe Ficalbiini
Genus Ficalbia
Genus Mimomyia
Subgenus Etorleptiomyia
Subgenus Ingramia
Subgenus Mimomyia

Tribe Hodgesiini
Genus Hodgesia

Tribe Mansoniini
Genus Coquillettidia
Subgenus Austromansonia
Subgenus Coquillettidia
Subgenus Rhynchotaenia
Genus Mansonia
Subgenus Coquillettidia
Subgenus Mansonioides

Tribe Orthopodomyiini
Genus Orthopodomyia

Tribe Sabethini
Genus Isostomyia
Genus Johnbelkinia
Genus Kimia
Genus Limatus
Genus Malaya
Genus Maorigoeldia
Genus Onirion
Genus Runchomyia
Subgenus Ctenogoeldia
Subgenus Runchomyia
Genus Sabethes
Subgenus Davismyia
Subgenus Peytonulus
Subgenus Sabethes
Subgenus Sabethinus
Subgenus Sabethoides
Genus Shannoniana
Genus Topomyia
Subgenus Suaymyia
Subgenus Topomyia
Genus Trichoprosopon
Genus Tripteroides
Subgenus Polylepidomyia
Subgenus Rachionotomyia
Subgenus Rachisoura
Subgenus Tricholeptomyia
Subgenus Tripteroides
Genus Wyeomyia
Subgenus Antunesmyia
Subgenus Caenomyiella
Subgenus Cruzmyia
Subgenus Decamyia
Subgenus Dendromyia
Subgenus Dodecamyia
Subgenus Exallomyia
Subgenus Hystatamyia
Subgenus Menolepis
Subgenus Nunezia
Subgenus Phoniomyia
Subgenus Prosopolepis
Subgenus Spilonympha
Subgenus Wyeomyia
Subgenus Zinzala

Tribe Toxorhynchitini
Genus Toxorhynchites
Subgenus Afrorhynchus
Subgenus Ankylorhynchus
Subgenus Lynchiella
Subgenus Toxorhynchites

Tribe Uranotaeniini
Genus Uranotaenia
Subgenus Pseudoficalbia
Subgenus Uranotaenia

References 

 List of
Mosquito